Federico Martín Van Lacke Falco (born 26 June 1980 in Santa Fe, Argentina) is an Argentine professional basketball player who plays for Juaristi ISB of the LEB Plata.

Professional career
Trained in Regatas de Santa Fe, Van Lacke signed his first professional contract with Atlético Echagüe of the Argentine Second Division in 1998. After spending three seasons in the club of Paraná, he moved to Spain for playing with Cantabria Lobos of the LEB Oro.

He played five seasons in the Spanish second league before making his debut in Liga ACB, the top league, with CB Granada in 2007. One year later, Van Lacke signs with CB Valladolid, relegated to LEB Oro, where he helps the team to promote to Liga ACB and to qualify it to the 2010 Copa del Rey. In the three seasons that he spent in Valladolid, he was claimed Player of the Month in January 2010.

In 2012, and after playing in seven teams in ten years, he comes back to Argentina for playing with Boca Juniors. Two years later, in 2014, he spends one more season in Spain with Estudiantes before continuing playing in Argentina with Ciclista Olímpico.

Personal life
Since October 2009, Van Lacke attained the dual Spanish-Argentine citizenship.

Trophies

With CB Valladolid
LEB Oro: (1)
2009

Awards and accomplishments
ACB Player of the Month: (1) January 2010

References

External links
Profile at ACB.com 
Profile at EuroCup website

Living people
1980 births
Argentine emigrants to Spain
Argentine expatriate basketball people in Spain
Argentine men's basketball players
Boca Juniors basketball players
Cantabria Baloncesto players
CB Estudiantes players
CB Granada players
CB Murcia players
CB Valladolid players
Ciclista Olímpico players
Gipuzkoa Basket players
Joventut Badalona players
Liga ACB players
Obras Sanitarias basketball players
Shooting guards
Sportspeople from Santa Fe, Argentina